Wilhelm Kühne may refer to:

 Wilhelm Kühne (1837–1900), German physiologist
 Wilhelm Kühne (aviator) (1888–1918), German World War I flying ace
 Wilhelm Otto Kühne (1924–1988), author of children's literature and editor in Cape Town, South Africa

See also
 Kühne (disambiguation)